Hockey Night in Canada began airing on Saturday nights on CBC Television in 1952. National coverage of the NHL in the U.S. was limited to Saturday afternoon regular season games on CBS, running for four seasons from 1956–57 to 1959–60.

Year-by-year breakdown

1953
In the 1952–53 season, CBC began televising Hockey Night in Canada as a simulcast to the radio calls, joining the games in progress either 30 minutes or 60 minutes after the opening faceoff. Until 1961, the CBC was the only operating television network in Canada. Not only that, it was likely that not all Toronto Maple Leafs and Montreal Canadiens playoff games were televised in the early years, including to their local markets.

1954
CBC's coverage of Games 3, 4 and 5 of the 1954 Stanley Cup Finals were joined in progress at 9:30 p.m. (approximately one hour after start time). Meanwhile, CBC joined Game 6 in at 10 p.m. (again, one hour after start time). Game 7 was carried Dominion wide (nationwide) from the opening face-off at 9 p.m. Since Game 7 was played on Good Friday night, there were no commercials (Imperial Oil was the sponsor).

1955
Game 3 of the Detroit-Toronto playoff series and Game 5 of the Boston-Montreal series were televised nationally.

1956
Game 4 of the Montreal-New York Rangers playoff series was not the potential clincher, nor was it played in Montreal.  Therefore, there was a possible chance that the game wasn't going to be televised.

1957
CBS aired games on Saturday afternoons with Bud Palmer  serving as the play-by-play announcer and Fred Cusick provided color commentary, pregame, and intermission interviews for the first three seasons. In , Cusick moved over to play-by-play while Brian McFarlane came in to do the color commentary, pregame, and intermission interviews. The pregame and intermission interviews were done on the ice, with the interviewer on skates. No playoff games were televised during this period, and all broadcasts took place in one of the four American arenas at the time.

As previously mentioned, CBS covered the 1956–57 season on Saturday afternoons, starting on January 5. For the next three years, CBS continued airing games on Saturday afternoons starting on November 2, 1957, October 18, 1958, and January 9, 1960.

Games 1, 2 and 4 of the Montreal-New York Rangers playoff series were not likely seen outside the Montreal region if not televised at all.

1958
Games 1, 2 and 3 of the Montreal-Detroit playoff series were likely not seen outside Quebec.

1959
CBC's telecast of Game 7 of Toronto-Boston playoff series at Boston Garden joins just before the start of the second period. Bill Hewitt and Foster Hewitt were simulcasting on Toronto's CKFH and CBC Radio, and one of them welcomes the television audience.

References

 
CBS Sports
CBC Sports
 
 
 
 
 
 
 
 
1950s in Canadian television
1950s in American television